Angio-associated, migratory cell protein, also known as AAMP, is a protein which in humans is encoded by the AAMP gene. This protein has been conserved in evolution and is so common to many mammals. and it also has a yeast homolog which is the protein YCR072c.

Localisation 

The gene is located on the second human chromosome, near the end of the chromosome's arm (2q35), between the codons 85-87 and 1387–1389. It contains 6042 bp and 11 exons When transcribed, it gives a 1859 bp mRNA.
. The vascular endothelial growth factor is a promoting factor of the protein synthesis and localisation in the different parts of the cells.
The protein's expression is higher in the intracellular than in the extracellular space.

Function 

The gene product is an immunoglobulin-type protein of 434 amino acids and 49 kDa. It is found to be expressed strongly in the cytosol of endothelial cells, cytotrophoblasts, and poorly differentiated colon adenocarcinoma cells found in lymphatics and has been observed at the luminal edges of endometrial cells and in the extracellular environment of vascular-associated mesenchymal cells.

The protein contains a WD40 domain which permits multi-proteins complexes formation  and a heparin-binding domain which mediates heparin-sensitive cell adhesion.
AAMP helps to regulate vascular endothelial cell migration regulation and angiogenesis, with other signaling pathway like RhoA/Rho-kinase signaling. 
A malfunction can therefore lead to different diseases (see Associated diseases). For example, in the smooth muscle cells, if AAMP is overexpressed, it activates RhoA, which activates Rho-kinase (this one generates GTP) and it finally leads to increased smooth muscle cell migration and division, causing atherosclerosis and restenosis.

Associated diseases 

Note : In all these diseases we can observe the expression of the AAMP gene. This one can either remain stable, increase or decrease depending on the disease.

List of the diseases : gastrointestinal stromal tumor (GIST) (for this disease and the ductal carcinomas, the expression levels are to correlate with necrosis in situ), myeloid leukemia (chronic (CML) and acute (AML) forms), lymphoma, breast cancer, glial brain tumors, colon neoplasia, epidermoid carcinoma, cervical cancer, ovarian cancer, papillary thyroid cancer, pulmonary cancer, atherosclerosis, restenosis.

References

External links

Further reading